James Arthur Hefner (June 20, 1941 – August 27, 2015) was president of Tennessee State University from 1991 to 2005.  Before serving as the president of Tennessee State University he served as president of Jackson State University in  Jackson, Mississippi. Earlier positions include provost of Tuskegee Institute, and professor of economics at Morehouse College.

Early life
Born in Brevard, North Carolina, Hefner was the son of Cordie Killian and Negro league outfielder Art Hefner. Although the Hefners were too poor to own books, James was soon recognized as exceptionally intelligent by his elementary school principal, and subsequently invited to visit her home and read her encyclopedias, an opportunity Hefner availed himself of every day after school for nearly eight years. Graduating as valedictorian of his elementary class and salutatorian of his high  School, he matriculated to North Carolina Agricultural and Technical State University in Greensboro, North Carolina, where he was a class mate of Jesse Jackson. Here, too, Hefner was singled out as an exceptionally able student, by Dr. Janieta Tate, Professor of Economics, who invited him to come to her house frequently to discuss economics. Graduating with a B.S. in Economics in 1961, Hefner earned a master's degree in economics two years later from Atlanta University, where he later taught for several years. In the meantime, beginning in October 1963, Hefner served at least briefly on the faculty of Benedict College. In 1971, he earned his Ph.D. in Economics from the University of Colorado. Hefner viewed his own role as carrying on the tradition of his teachers, encouraging young African-Americans to achieve their full potential.

Clark Atlanta University

Jackson State University

Dr. James A. Hefner became the seventh president of Jackson State University on May 1, 1984, serving until April 1, 1991. Upon assuming the Presidency, he launched a five-year $10 million capital campaign generating $11.2 million a year ahead of schedule. This administration was characterized by enhancement of the scholarship program; establishment of a Community Development Corporation with the assistance of the Ford Foundation to improve the blighted area around the campus; organization of a Staff Senate; establishment of the Center for Professional Development and the Center of Technology Transfer, and expansion of programs through the Division of Continuing Education and the Universities Center.

Tennessee State University
During Hefner's 14-year tenure as president of Tennessee State University, he oversaw the implementation of a $112 million capital improvement plan, secured as part of the Geier agreement that attempted to end race-based disparity in higher education spending in Tennessee. Several new buildings were built, including a campus center, an administration building, and a performing arts center. Enrollment reached an all-time high of 9,100 students.

Later life
After Hefner's retirement, he joined the Du Bois Institute as a Harvard Fellow. Hefner was a member of Omega Psi Phi fraternity. He died of colon cancer on August 27, 2015 at the age of 74. He was survived by his wife of 51 years, the former Edwina Marvaline Long, and their three sons.

References

African-American academics
Presidents of Jackson State University
2015 deaths
Benedict College faculty
Tennessee State University presidents
Morehouse College faculty
North Carolina A&T State University alumni
University of Colorado alumni
1941 births
20th-century African-American people
21st-century African-American people